Austin County is a rural, agricultural dominated county in the U.S. state of Texas. As of the 2020 census, the population was 30,167. Its seat is Bellville. The county and region was settled primarily by German emigrants in the 1800s.

Austin County is included in the Houston–The Woodlands–Sugar Land Metropolitan Statistical Area.

Austin County does not contain the city of Austin, the state capital of Texas, which lies in Travis County, about 110 miles to the northwest.

History
In 1836, the Texas Legislature established Austin County, naming it for Stephen F. Austin, who facilitated Texas' Anglo-American colonization.

Geography

Adjacent counties
 Washington County (north)
 Waller County (east)
 Fort Bend County (southeast)
 Wharton County (south)
 Colorado County (west)
 Fayette County (northwest)

Communities

Cities 
 Bellville (county seat)
 Brazos Country
 Sealy
 South Frydek
 Wallis

Town
 Industry
 San Felipe

Unincorporated communities

 Bleiblerville
 Buckhorn
 Burleigh
 Cat Spring
 Cochran
 Frydek
 Kenney
 Millheim
 Nelsonville
 New Wehdem
 New Ulm
 Peters
 Post Oak Point
 Raccoon Bend
 Rockhouse
 Shelby
 Wehdem
 Welcome

Ghost town
 Rexville

Demographics

As of the census of 2000,  23,590 people, 8,747 households, and 6,481 families resided in the county.  The population density was 36 people per square mile (14/km2).  The 10,205 housing units averaged 16 per square mile (6/km2).  The racial makeup of the county was 80.22% White, 10.64% African American, 0.28% Native American, 0.29% Asian, 6.99% from other races, and 1.58% from two or more races.  About 16.13% of the population was Hispanic or Latino of any race, and 26.9% were of German, 8.0% Czech, 6.4% English, and 5.0% Irish ancestry according to Census 2000.

Of the 8,747 households, 34.70% had children under the age of 18 living with them, 60.60% were married couples living together, 9.60% had a female householder with no husband present, and 25.90% were not families; 22.80% of all households were made up of individuals, and 11.50% had someone living alone who was 65 years of age or older.  The average household size was 2.67 and the average family size was 3.14.

In the county, the population was distributed as 27.00% under the age of 18, 8.10% from 18 to 24, 26.40% from 25 to 44, 23.70% from 45 to 64, and 14.80% who were 65 years of age or older.  The median age was 38 years. For every 100 females, there were 96.50 males.  For every 100 females age 18 and over, there were 92.90 males.

The median income for a household in the county was $38,615, and for a family was $46,342. Males had a median income of $32,455 versus $22,142 for females. The per capita income for the county was $18,140.  About 8.80% of families and 12.10% of the population were below the poverty line, including 13.70% of those under age 18 and 14.40% of those age 65 or over.

Politics

United States Congress 

Austin County is part of Texas's 10th congressional district, which as of 2019 is represented in the United States House of Representatives by Michael McCaul.

Texas Legislature

Texas Senate 
District 18: Lois Kolkhorst (R) – first elected in 2014

Texas House of Representatives 
District 13: Ben Leman (R) – first elected in 2018

Austin County Courthouse 
County Judge: Tim Lapham (R)

Tax Assessor-Collector: Marcus A. Peña (R) – first elected in 2012

Education
The following school districts serve Austin County:
 Bellville Independent School District
 Brazos Independent School District (partial) (Formerly Wallis-Orchard ISD)
 Brenham Independent School District (partial)
 Columbus Independent School District (partial)
 Sealy Independent School District
 Burton Independent School District
(partial)

Blinn Junior College District is the designated community college for most of the county. Areas in Brazos ISD are in Wharton County Junior College District.

Transportation

Major highways
  Interstate 10
  U.S. Highway 90
  State Highway 36
  State Highway 159

The TTC-69 component (recommended preferred) of the once-planned Trans-Texas Corridor went through Austin County.

See also

 Adelsverein
 List of museums in the Texas Gulf Coast
 National Register of Historic Places listings in Austin County, Texas
 Recorded Texas Historic Landmarks in Austin County

References

External links

 Austin County website
 
 Austin County from the Texas Almanac
 Austin County from the TXGenWeb Project
 Historic Austin County materials, hosted by the Portal to Texas History.

 
1837 establishments in the Republic of Texas
Populated places established in 1837
Greater Houston